Building at 239 North Gay Street, also known as Spartana Electronics, is a historic building located at Baltimore, Maryland, United States. It is a tall three-story iron-front structure of Italianate style built in 1875. It represents a Full Cast Iron Front and Major Exterior Cast Iron Detail type building.  It was altered at street level by the construction of a modern store façade. Large window openings are flanked by Corinthian columns and headed by segmental arches. In 1974, the property was purchased by Anthony R. Spartana, who founded an electronic supplies business in 1925.

Building at 239 North Gay Street was listed on the National Register of Historic Places in 1994.

References

External links
, including photo from 1987, at Maryland Historical Trust

Cast-iron architecture in Baltimore
Commercial buildings on the National Register of Historic Places in Baltimore
Commercial buildings completed in 1875
Italianate architecture in Maryland
Jonestown, Baltimore